Kavli is a Norwegian brand of soft cheese, caviar, mayonnaise, crackers and milk.  The company sells products in 30 countries, with plants in Norway, Finland, Sweden, Denmark, England and Scotland.

In 1914, Olav Kavli founded Kavli Holding A/S.  In 1924, Olav Kavli invented a way to produce long-lasting soft cheese and launched the Primula brand.  Later the corporation introduced new related products. In 1962, the ownership of the company was transferred  to the Kavli Trust which is headquartered at Nesttun outside Bergen, Norway.

References

External links
 Kavli Group website

 
Norwegian brands
Dairy products companies of Norway